Fronalpstock may refer to two mountains in Switzerland with the same name:

 Fronalpstock (Glarus), in the Glarus Alps and the canton of Glarus
 Fronalpstock (Schwyz), in the Schwyzer Alps and the canton of Schwyz